Baron Eligius Franz Joseph von Münch-Bellinghausen (2 April 180622 May 1871) was an Austrian dramatist, poet and novella writer of the Austrian Biedermeier period and beyond, and is more generally known under his pseudonym Friedrich Halm.

Life and career 
He was the son of a district judge at Kraków in Poland, at this time part of the Austrian Empire. Early in his literary career he adopted the nom de plume of Friedrich Halm ("Halm" means a blade of grass or a blade of straw), and became one of the most popular dramatists in Vienna around the middle of the 19th century. His novellas are now regarded as more significant from a literary point of view than his dramatic writings.

Münch-Bellinghausen was educated at the seminary of Melk Abbey and later at Vienna, where he studied philosophy and jurisprudence, and where he began his career in 1826.

As a boy he took a keen interest in the theater, and from 1833 enjoyed the friendship of his former teacher, the Benedictine Michael Leopold Enk von der Burg, who encouraged the poet to offer his drama Griseldis to the Hofburg theatre.
Its successful production in 1835 established Halm's reputation as a playwright and henceforth he continued to write for the stage with varying success.

He was elected member of the Austrian Academy of Sciences in 1852, and life member of the Austrian Herrenhaus in 1861. In 1867, he was appointed superintendent of the two court-theatres (the Burgtheater and the Court Opera, the current Vienna State Opera), but three years later resigned this position which disputes had made distasteful to him. His health also had been failing.

Literary work 

Friedrich Halm's earliest full-length drama, Schwert, Hammer, Buch, completed in 1833 but not published in his lifetime, explores three various routes in quest of happiness: that of the warrior, that of the artisan, and that of the artist. 
This massive drama of several hundred pages, although still a piece of 'juvenilia', has numerous effective passages and anticipates the literary talent that was to burst upon the Viennese literary scene just three or four years later with the publication of Halm's tragedy, Griseldis. Of his many dramatic works the best known are, indeed, Griseldis (1837); Der Adept (1836; publ. 1838), Camoens (1838), Der Sohn der Wildnis (1842), and Der Fechter von Ravenna (1857).  Griseldis is based on the well-known story of the faithful wife whose loyalty and devotion are put to the severest tests but who triumphs in the end. Der Sohn der Wildnis ("The Son of the Wilderness") is a romantic drama depicting the power of womanly love and virtue over rude barbarian strength.  It was presented on the English stage under the title of Ingomar the Barbarian. Der Fechter von Ravenna ("The Gladiator of Ravenna"), regarded as one of Halm's best dramas, is a tragedy having for its hero Thumelicus the son of Arminius, the liberator of Germany from Roman rule. According to the Encyclopædia Britannica Eleventh Edition, "[his plays] are distinguished by elegance of language, melodious versification and clever construction, and were for a time exceedingly popular."

Theatrically these plays are very effective, but the characters are improbable and the situations are often strained. Their popularity, which they owe largely to their smooth, polished and beautiful diction and skillfully interspersed lyrics, has not been lasting. Of Halm's numerous other dramas we may mention the vivid and powerful Sampiero (1856, depicting the tragic loss of humanity attendant upon political fanaticism); Iphigenie in Delphi (1856); Begum Somru (1863); Wildfeuer (1864); a German version of Shakespeare's Cymbeline that appeared on the stage in 1842, and an extremely effective and humorous comedy entitled Verbot und Befehl ("Prohibition and Decree", 1856).

He is also the author of lyrics, short stories, and of a narrative poem Charfreitag ("Good Friday") (1864). His poems, Gedichte, were published in Stuttgart, 1850 (new ed. Vienna. 1877). His pessimistic  seems to have been formed very early on in life and never to have deserted him, as evidenced by early poems such as Eine Makame and later poems, Schwere Jahre. These describe how life is seen as essentially a vale of tears and filled with suffering, and only made bearable by the hope of a blissful and tranquil life of the spirit. These will supervene after physical death.

Halm's high reputation during his lifetime is indicated by the stone bust which was carved of him and which still sits on top of the famous Burgtheater in Vienna, alongside those of Schiller, Goethe and Grillparzer.

From an early age, Halm showed an aptitude for fictional narrative, perhaps first exemplified in the charming tale, Die Abendgenossen, written when Halm was in his early twenties. Another early novella from this period, Ein Abend zu L, contains insights on sex and homosexuality which anticipate Freudian psycho-analytical notions. Dr. Tony Page writes on this:

"In view of its daring delineations of human sexuality and repressed sexual urges, its potentially progressive view of same-sex love and general exploration of the human psyche in the grip of passion, Ein Abend zu L. constitutes a remarkable early 19th-century literary document, providing pre-echoes of psycho-analytical ideas that would take the Western world by storm less than a century later."
 
Halm's other short stories, or novellas, which tend to focus on spiritual issues and self-destructive monomaniacal characters, are far superior to most of his dramas and are striking and impressive in content, full of psychological insights—especially his earliest major story, Das Auge Gottes ("The Eye of God"), a lengthy novella written in 1826, about the supernatural reverberations of the blasphemous act of the desecration of a holy icon, and his final narrative masterpiece, Das Haus an der Veronabrücke  ("The House on Verona Bridge"), centring on the inner collapse of a man given over to a morally repellent but overriding  (the enforced sexual coupling of his wife with another man).  His novella, Die Marzipan-Lise ("Marzipan Lise"), is credited with being one of the first "criminal fiction tales" of German literature and is now available as an audio book on CD. Furthermore, the composer, Brahms, used some of Halm's verses as the basis for a number of his Lieder, as did composer Pauline Volkstein.

Overall it can be said that it is as a short-story or "novella" writer that Halm has secured a place in the history of German/Austrian literature. His novellas mark Halm out as a writer of talent, psychological penetration and substance. His novella, The House at Verona Bridge (Das Haus an der Veronabruecke) alone stands as a milestone in 19th-century Austrian literature for its probing and insightful treatment of an obsessive mentality that inevitably leads its possessor into tragedy and death.

His collected works, Samtliche Werke, were published arranged in chronological order in eight volumes (1856–1864), to which four posthumous volumes were added in 1872. Also published were Ausgewählte Werke, ed. by Anton Schlossar in 4 vols. (1904). Published in the 21st century in Amazon Kindle format were a collection of poems entitled Unpublished Poems of Friedrich Halm (2011), the full text of Halm's novella, Das Auge Gottes (2011), as well as Halm's novella, Ein Abend zu L. (2012), in addition to Halm's essay on literary aesthetics, Sendschreiben an J. C. R. (2012), all transcribed and edited by Dr. Tony Page.

Works

Plays 
 Schwert, Hammer, Buch, 1833
 Griseldis, 1835
 Der Adept, 1836
 Camoens, 1837
 Imelda Lambertazzi, 1838
 Ein mildes Urteil, 1840
 König und Bauer, 1841
 Der Sohn der Wildnis, 1842
 Sampiero, 1844
 Maria da Molina, 1847
 Verbot und Befehl, 1848
 Der Fechter von Ravenna, 1854
 Eine Königin, 1857
 Iphigenie in Delphi, 1857
 Vor hundert Jahren, 1859
 Begum Somru, 1860
 Wildfeuer, 1864

Stories 
 St. Sylvesterabend, composed 1823, published 2017
 Das Auge Gottes, ('The Eye of God'), 1826
 Ein Abend zu L., 1828
 Die Marzipanliese, 1856
 Die Freundinnen, 1860
 Das Haus an der Veronabrücke, ('The House by Verona Bridge'), 1864

English translations of the novellas,  Das Haus an der Veronabrücke and Das Auge Gottes:

 The House by Verona Bridge   translated by Dr. Tony Page, Blade Publications, Bangkok, 2017, Kindle e-book
 The Eye of God   translated by Dr. Tony Page, Blade Publications, Bangkok, 2017, Kindle e-book

Collections 
 Gedichte, 1850
 Gesammelte Werke, 8 vols., 1856-1864
 Erzählungen

References

 See also: Friedrich Halm's "Das Auge Gottes": An Analysis of the Complete Text by Dr. Tony Page (Doctoral Dissertation, Oxford University, 1988).
 See also Austrian literature
See also: Das Auge Gottes by Friedrich Halm, edited by Dr. Tony Page, Blade Publications 2011, Bangkok, Kindle Edition ASIN: B005MJGS9Q
Unpublished Poems by Friedrich Halm, edited by Dr. Tony Page, Blade Publications 2011, Bangkok, Kindle Edition ASIN: B005MGDME8
St. Sylvesterabend by Friedrich Halm, edited by Dr. Tony Page, Blade Publications 2017, Bangkok, Kindle Edition ASIN: B07261VSHG

External links 

 Scholarly article on Halm's Novella, The Eye of God, in relation to his Aesthetic Essay, Letter to J. C. R.  
 Research article on Friedrich Halm and the Demon of Sex  http://www.manusya.journals.chula.ac.th/files/essay/FRIEDRICH%20HALM_51-67.pdf.

Austrian male dramatists and playwrights
19th-century Austrian poets
Austrian male poets
University of Vienna alumni
Barons of Austria
Austrian expatriates in Poland
Writers from Kraków
1806 births
1871 deaths
19th-century Austrian dramatists and playwrights
19th-century Austrian male writers